The Khātūniyya Madrasa is a mausoleum in Jerusalem and was a school. 
It is by the western esplanade of the al-Aqsa Compound (the Ḥaram esh-Sharīf). 
It was built between 1354 and 1380.

It is one of the three Jerusalem madrasas endowed by a woman, the others being the ʿUthmāniyya Madrasa and the obscure Barudiyya.

History 

It was first endowed in 1349 by Oghul Khatun, a woman from Baghdad and a daughter of Shams al-Din Muhammad bin Sayf al-Din.

She was called al-Qazaniyya, possibly meaning she was married to Qazan Shah, an emir. 
The lady , a daughter of Qazan Shah, completed the construction by giving another endowment to the project in 1380.

Part of the endowment consisted of agricultural land known as "the Camel’s Back", also known as "the Camel’s Belly". In a court record in 1491-92, the waqf of Oghul Khatun is mentioned, and it is noted that the Camel’s Belly is near Deir Jarir, and that its yearly revenue was 3,800 aspers.

In the late Mamluk era, it served as the retirement residence of several former emirs who had been dismissed and sent into exile to Jerusalem. 

In the early Ottoman era, the building's administration was in the Ibn Jama‘a family.

It is now in disrepair and intensive restorations would be needed.

Description 

It consists of two levels. The higher level is beside the Ḥaram compound and includes two iwans, a tomb chamber, and an assembly hall. The lower level is below the level of the Ḥaram and includes habitation cells around a courtyard.
The courtyard has a wellhead, giving access to a cistern below.

In addition to the tomb of Oghul Khatun, it includes the tombs of several prominent people:
 Mohammad Ali Jauhar (Muhammad Ali al-Hindi), a founder of the All-India Muslim League.
 some members of the Husayni (Husseini) family:
 Musa al-Husayni, a leader in the Palestine Arab Congress.
 Abd al-Qader al-Husseini, an uprising commander.
 Faisal Husseini, a statesman.
 Ahmed Hilmi Pasha, soldier, economist, and politician
 , the founder of the Arab Bank.

Environs 

To its east, it joins the Ḥaram compound's west wall's  (arcade), which includes the Cotton Merchants' Gate to the south.

It is immediately north of the Cotton Merchants' Market.
Farther south is ʿUthmāniyya Madrasa.

To its north are the Muzhiriyya & Arghūniyya Madrasas.
Its current entrance is a small passageway between those two madrasas, leading north to Iron Gate Road.

References

Bibliography

 

 (pp. 129−140)

External links
Madrasa al-Khatuniyya, archnet
Al-Madrasah Al-Khatuniyya

Schools in Jerusalem
1354 establishments